John Joseph Compton (May 17, 1928 – January 18, 2014) was an American philosopher and Emeritus Professor of Philosophy at Vanderbilt University (retired in 1998). Compton was a president of the Metaphysical Society of America (1979). He was the son of Arthur Compton.

References

20th-century American philosophers
Philosophy academics
1929 births
2014 deaths
Presidents of the Metaphysical Society of America
Vanderbilt University faculty
Yale University alumni
College of Wooster alumni